Socolescu is a Romanian surname. Notable people with the surname include:

Grigore Socolescu (1905–?), Romanian bobsledder
Mircea Socolescu, Romanian bobsledder
Toma Barbu Socolescu, Romanian architect
Toma T. Socolescu, Romanian architect

Romanian-language surnames